Viktor Gehring (10 January 1889 – 24 April 1978) was a German stage and film actor.

Selected filmography
 The Hunter of Fall (1918)
 The Monastery's Hunter (1920)
 The Chain of Guilt (1921)
 Trutzi from Trutzberg (1922)
 Monna Vanna (1922)
 Martin Luther (1923)
 The Affair of Baroness Orlovska (1923)
 I Lost My Heart in Heidelberg (1926)
 The League of Three (1929)
 The Tiger Murder Case (1930)
 Hubertus Castle (1934)
 Marriage Strike (1935)
 The Monastery's Hunter (1935)
 Militiaman Bruggler (1936)
 Signal in the Night (1937)
 Storms in May (1938)
 The Rainer Case (1942)
 The Cloister of Martins (1951)

References

Bibliography
 Giesen, Rolf. Nazi Propaganda Films: A History and Filmography. McFarland, 2003.

External links

1889 births
1978 deaths
German male stage actors
German male film actors
German male silent film actors
20th-century German male actors